Carlo Cottone, prince of Castelnuovo, (Palermo, 30 September 1756 – Palermo, 24 December 1829) was a Sicilian politician, known as one of the main advocates of the .

External links 
 CASTELNUOVO, Carlo Cottone marchese di Villahermosa e principe di, Dizionario Biografico degli Italiani 

Sicilian nationalists
Members of the Sicilian Parliament
Politicians from Palermo
1756 births
1829 deaths